"This D" is a song by American hip hop recording artist TeeFlii from his first official mixtape AnNieRuO'TAY 1. The song was released on October 2, 2013 by Excuse My Liquor and Epic Records as his debut single. It was produced by frequent collaborator DJ Mustard. After receiving a high amount of radio airplay, the song peaked at number 35 on the US Billboard Rhythmic chart.

Background 
The song was originally released in November 2012 as a part of TeeFlii's first official mixtape AnNieRuO'TAY 1. On July 4, 2013, DJ Mustard and TeeFlii released a collaboration mixtape titled Fireworks. It was entirely produced by DJ Mustard and featured collaborations with Dom Kennedy, Casey Veggies, Ty Dolla Sign, Omarion, Kevin McCall, and E-40.

Commercial performance 
On September 20, 2013, "This D" debuted on the US Billboard Rhythmic chart at number 38. It received serious support on hometown Power 106, being played nearly 800 times during the previous week. The song would end up peaking at number 35 on that chart.

Music video 
On July 16, 2013, Vice premiered the song's music video, also praising TeeFlii as Los Angeles' best R&B singer. The video was directed by Topshelf Junior and it highlights the fun, party vibe of the record.

Remix 
On July 16, 2013, The Game released a freestyle to "This D". On September 6, 2013, a remix featuring Jadakiss was premiered online. The day after the song's retail release, on October 3, 2013, the song's official remix featuring Tyga and Jadakiss was released. The remix was then serviced to DJ's as a promotional single.

Chart performance

Release history

References 

2013 songs
2013 singles
Mustard (record producer) songs
Song recordings produced by Mustard (record producer)
Epic Records singles
Songs written by Mustard (record producer)